The Strait of Georgia or the Georgia Strait  is an arm of the Salish Sea between Vancouver Island and the extreme southwestern mainland coast of British Columbia, Canada and the extreme northwestern mainland coast of Washington, United States. Along with the Strait of Juan de Fuca and Puget Sound, it is a constituent part of the Salish Sea.

Archipelagos and narrow channels mark each end of the Strait of Georgia, the Gulf Islands and San Juan Islands in the south, and the Discovery Islands in the north. The main channels to the south are Boundary Pass, Haro Strait and Rosario Strait, which connect the Strait of Georgia to the Strait of Juan de Fuca. In the north, Discovery Passage is the main channel connecting the Strait of Georgia to Johnstone Strait.  The strait is a major navigation channel on the west coast of North America, owing to the presence of the port of Vancouver, and also due to its role as the southern entrance to the Intracoastal route known as the Inside Passage.

Geography 
The United States Geological Survey defines the southern boundary of the Strait of Georgia as a line running from East Point on Saturna Island to Patos Island, Sucia Island, and Matia Island, then to Point Midgley on Lummi Island. This line touches  the northern edges of Rosario Strait, which leads south to the Strait of Juan de Fuca, and Boundary Pass, which leads south to Haro Strait and the Strait of Juan de Fuca.

The Fraser River accounts for roughly 80 percent of the freshwater entering the strait. Water circulates in the strait in a generally counterclockwise direction.

Major islands
Other major islands include Nelson Island, Denman Island, Lasqueti Island, and Hornby Island.

"Gulf of Georgia"
The term "Gulf of Georgia" includes waters other than the Georgia Strait proper, such as the inter-insular straits and channels of the Gulf Islands, and may refer to communities on the shore of southern Vancouver Island. As defined by George Vancouver in 1792, the Gulf of Georgia included all the inland waters beyond the eastern end of the Strait of Juan de Fuca, including Puget Sound, Bellingham Bay, the waters around the San Juan Islands, as well as the Strait of Georgia.

History

First Nations communities have surrounded the Strait of Georgia for thousands of years. The first European exploration of the area was undertaken by Captain Jose Maria Narvaez and Pilot Juan Carrasco of Spain in 1791. At this time Francisco de Eliza gave the strait the name "Gran Canal de Nuestra Señora del Rosario la Marinera."

In 1792, it was renamed for King George III as the "Gulf of Georgia" by George Vancouver of Great Britain, during his extensive expedition along the west coast of North America. Vancouver designated the mainland in this region as New Georgia and areas farther north as New Hanover and New Bremen.

The two busiest routes of the BC Ferries system cross the strait, between Tsawwassen (south of Vancouver) and Swartz Bay (near Victoria) and between Horseshoe Bay (north of Vancouver) and Nanaimo.

The Strait of Georgia is known as a premier scuba diving and whale watching location.

In 1967, the Georgia Strait inspired the name of Vancouver's alternative newspaper, The Georgia Straight, which has been published continuously since.

Cities
Towns and cities on the strait include Campbell River, Courtenay, Comox, Qualicum Beach, Parksville, Lantzville, and Nanaimo on the western shore, as well as Powell River, Sechelt, Gibsons, and Greater Vancouver on the east.

Across the border in the United States, Bellingham, Washington and other communities also lie on the eastern shore. Other settlements on Vancouver Island (such as Duncan) and the mainland are separated from Georgia Strait itself by islands and lesser straits but are often spoken of as being in the Strait of Georgia region.

Transportation 

BC Ferries operates ferry services connecting Vancouver Island with the mainland. Notable lines include Duke Point-Tsawwassen, Departure Bay-Horseshoe Bay, and Little River-Westview. Minor ferry operators and water taxis provide service to minor islands dotting the strait.

Salish Sea

In March 2008, the Chemainus First Nation proposed renaming the strait the "Salish Sea", an idea that reportedly met with approval by B.C.'s Aboriginal Relations Minister Mike de Jong, who pledged to put it before the B.C. cabinet for discussion. Making the name "Salish Sea" official required a formal application to the Geographical Names Board of Canada. A parallel American movement promoting the name had a different definition, combining of the Strait of Juan de Fuca and Puget Sound as well as the Strait of Georgia and related waters under the name Salish Sea. This latter definition was made official in 2009 by geographic boards of Canada and the United States.

In October 2009, the Washington state Board of Geographic Names approved the Salish Sea toponym, not to replace the names of the Strait of Georgia, Puget Sound, and Strait of Juan de Fuca, but instead as a collective term for all three. The British Columbia Geographical Names Office passed a resolution recommending that the name only be adopted by the Geographical Names Board of Canada should its US counterpart approve the name change. The United States Board on Geographic Names approved the name on November 12, 2009 and Canada approved it in 2010.

Counties and regional districts facing the Strait
British Columbia
 Capital Regional District
 Comox Valley Regional District
 Cowichan Valley Regional District
 Metro Vancouver Regional District
 Nanaimo Regional District
 qathet Regional District
 Strathcona Regional District
 Sunshine Coast Regional District
 Washington
 San Juan County
 Whatcom County

See also
 Howe Sound
 Sunshine Coast
 Burrard Peninsula
 Georgia Basin
 Royal eponyms in Canada

References

Further reading 
 Levings, C., Kieser, D., Jamieson, G.S., & Dudas, S. (2002). "Marine and estuarine alien species in the Strait of Georgia, British Columbia." In R. Claudi, P. Nantel, & E. Muckle-Jeffs (Eds.), Alien invaders in Canada’s waters, wetlands, and forests (pp. 111–132). Ottawa: Canadian Forest Service, Natural Resources Canada. Retrieved 2016-08-03 from http://hdl.handle.net/10613/2904

External links

Map and information from the Georgia Strait Alliance
A Potential Fixed Link to Vancouver Island - report from the British Columbia Ministry of Transportation
Google Satellite Image, Accessed August 7, 2006

 
Landforms of Vancouver
Bodies of water of Vancouver Island
South Coast of British Columbia
Landforms of San Juan County, Washington
Seas of the Pacific Ocean
Seas of Canada